Dunstanetta johnstoneorum is a genus and species of extinct duck from the Miocene of New Zealand. It was described from fossil material (a distal left humerus) collected from a Saint Bathans Fauna site on Home Hills Station, in the lower Bannockburn Formation of the Manuherikia Group, in the Manuherikia River valley in the Central Otago region of the South Island. The genus name refers to the Dunstan Range, the mountains of which overlook the fossil site. The specific epithet honours Ann and Euan Johnstone of Home Hills Station.

References

Fossil taxa described in 2007
Birds described in 2007
Anatidae
Miocene birds
Extinct birds of New Zealand
Extinct monotypic bird genera